Kaibeto is a census-designated place (CDP) in Coconino County, Arizona, United States.  The population was 1,522 at the 2010 census.

Geography
Kaibeto is located at  (36.577172, -111.099694), at an elevation of 5,810 feet (1,771 m).

Climate
According to the Köppen Climate Classification system, Kaibeto has a semi-arid climate, abbreviated "BSk" on climate maps.

Demographics

As of the census of 2000, there were 1,607 people, 333 households, and 302 families living in the CDP. There were 398 housing units at an average density of 24.9/sq mi (9.6/km2). The racial makeup of the CDP was 99.2% Native American, 0.4% White, 0.1% Black or African American, and 0.4% from two or more races.  0.1% of the population were Hispanic or Latino of any race.

There were 333 households, out of which 68.2% had children under the age of 18 living with them, 65.8% were married couples living together, 21.3% had a female householder with no husband present, and 9.3% were non-families. 8.7% of all households were made up of individuals, and 2.7% had someone living alone who was 65 years of age or older.  The average household size was 4.83 and the average family size was 5.17.

In the CDP, the population was spread out, with 49.3% under the age of 18, 11.1% from 18 to 24, 24.3% from 25 to 44, 12.0% from 45 to 64, and 3.3% who were 65 years of age or older.  The median age was 18 years. For every 100 females, there were 97.2 males.  For every 100 females age 18 and over, there were 87.4 males.

The median income for a household in the CDP was $36,250, and the median income for a family was $41,016. Males had a median income of $31,477 versus $18,472 for females. The per capita income for the CDP was $8,465.  About 25.7% of families and 28.8% of the population were below the poverty line, including 30.4% of those under age 18 and 34.4% of those age 65 or over.

Education
There are two Bureau of Indian Education (BIE)-affiliated schools for Native Americans in the area, the K-8 Kaibeto Boarding School in Kaibito and the Shonto Preparatory School (K-12) in Shonto.

Most of the Kaibito CDP is served by the Page Unified School District, while a portion is in the Tuba City Unified School District. Page High School and Tuba City High School are their respective comprehensive high schools.

See also

 List of census-designated places in Arizona
 List of communities on the Navajo Nation

References

External links

Census-designated places in Coconino County, Arizona
Populated places on the Navajo Nation
Arizona placenames of Native American origin